Adie Inlet is an ice-filled inlet,  long in a northwest–southeast direction, lying east of Churchill Peninsula along the east coast of Graham Land. Charted by the Falkland Islands Dependencies Survey (FIDS) and photographed from the air by the Ronne Antarctic Research Expedition (RARE) during 1947. Named by the FIDS for R.J. Adie, South African geologist with FIDS, 1947–49.

Further reading 
 Tony Soper, A guide to the wildlife
 I. L. MILLAR, R. J. PANKHURST & C. M. FANNING, Basement chronology of the Antarctic Peninsula: recurrent magmatism and anatexis in the Palaeozoic Gondwana Margin, Journal of the Geological Society, London, Vol. 159, 2002, pp. 145–157
 Daniel McGrath, Konrad Steffen, Paul R. Holland, Ted Scambos, Harihar Rajaram, Waleed Abdalati, Eric Rignot, The structure and effect of suture zones in the Larsen C Ice Shelf, Antarctica, 12 February 2014, https://doi.org/10.1002/2013JF002935
  R. L. Oliver, P. R. James, J. B. Jago, editors Antarctic Earth Science, P 370
  International Symposium on Antarctic Earth, Geological Evolution of Antarctica, P 372

References

Inlets of Graham Land
Graham Coast